Patrick Stübing (born 1976) is a German man who has four children in an incestuous relationship with his sister, Susan Karolewski. He has served several prison sentences for breaking the law against sexual intercourse between siblings, and Karolewski was allowed to keep only their fourth child. Their case has featured in discussions about whether sibling sexual relations should be decriminalised in Germany.

Background
Stübing, a locksmith, was born in Leipzig, East Germany, the second of five children. He was taken into care at age three after being attacked by his alcoholic father, was adopted at age seven by his foster parents, and grew up in Potsdam. His sister was born in 1984. Stübing met his mother, who had separated from his father and had a new partner, and his sister in 2000, when he was 23 and Karolewski was 16. According to Stübing, the relationship between him and his sister became incestuous after their mother died suddenly in December 2000. Their other siblings have died.

Incestuous relationship and legal sentences
Karolewski, who has a personality disorder and a minor mental disability, gave birth to their first child in October 2001. After a social worker reported suspicions of incest, Stübing received a suspended sentence in 2002. Karolewski subsequently gave birth to two more children; at Stübing's second trial, in 2004, she was accused as his co-defendant because the second child was conceived after her 18th birthday. He was sentenced to 10 months in prison and she to 6 months under the supervision of a social worker. Neither was assigned a lawyer; Stübing appealed the verdict. By November 2006, he had served the time and been released.

The couple's first two children are slightly mentally and physically disabled; the third was born with a heart defect that was corrected with surgery. All three were placed in foster care. Karolewski's fourth child, a daughter born in 2005, was healthy and was not taken from her. At a third trial in 2005, she was again sentenced to supervision and Stübing was sentenced to 14 months in prison. His lawyer appealed to the Federal Constitutional Court; Stübing's appeal was denied in March 2008, and in April 2012 he lost an appeal to the European Court of Human Rights under Article 8 of the European Convention on Human Rights (Right to respect for private and family life). Stübing requested the case be referred to the Grand Chamber, but in September 2012 that request was rejected and the judgement became final.

In 2004, Stübing underwent a voluntary vasectomy. During his third imprisonment, Karolewski reportedly had a fifth child by another man; the couple resumed living together on Stübing's release.

Legal issues
Under paragraph 173 of the German criminal code, sexual relations between close relatives are illegal and punishable by up to three years in prison, but most cases of incest are instead prosecuted as child abuse. In 2014, in response to the case of Stübing and Karolewski, the German Ethics Council voted in favour of decriminalising consensual incest between siblings. Legality of incest between adult biological siblings is not always treated the same as other kinds of incest such as between cousins, and laws have been amended in the case of consensual adult incestuous relationships in Brazil, France, Japan, and Turkey.

References

1976 births
Living people
21st-century German criminals
German adoptees
People convicted of incest
People from Leipzig
Criminals from Saxony
Child sexual abuse in Germany